Union Sportive Tyrossaise Rugby Côte Sud (also known as just US Tyrosse) is a French rugby union club, currently playing in the third division of the French league system, in Fédérale 1. Tyrosse were relegated from the Rugby Pro D2 competition down to Fédérale 1 after the 2005–06 season. Tyrosse were formed in 1919.

Honours
 Groupe B:
 Champion : 1981
 Challenge de l'Espérance:
 Champions : 1982

Famous players
 Guy Accoceberry
 André Alvarez 
 Pierre Armentia
 Guy Camberabero
 Pierre Daulouède
 Pierre Dizabo 
 François Gelez 
 Louis Junquas 
 Jean-Joseph Rupert

See also
 List of rugby union clubs in France

Further reading
 Rugby mode de vie: Ethnographie d'un club Saint-Vincent-de-Tyrosse, de Sébastien Darbon, coll. Cahiers de Gradhiva, éd. Jean-Michel Place, 1997.

External links
Official website
FFR page 

Tyrosse
Sport in Landes (department)